Uraecha is a genus of longhorn beetles of the subfamily Lamiinae, containing the following species:

 Uraecha albosparsa Pic, 1925
 Uraecha albovittata Breuning, 1956
 Uraecha angusta (Pascoe, 1856)
 Uraecha bimaculata Thomson, 1864
 Uraecha chinensis Breuning, 1935
 Uraecha curta Breuning, 1957
 Uraecha gilva Yokoyama, 1966
 Uraecha laosica Breuning, 1982
 Uraecha longzhouensis Wang & Chiang, 2000
 Uraecha obliquefasciata Chiang, 1951
 Uraecha ochreomarmorata Breuning, 1965
 Uraecha oshimana Breuning, 1954
 Uraecha perplexa Gressitt, 1942
 Uraecha punctata Gahan, 1888
 Uraecha yunnana Breuning, 1936

References

Lamiini